Patrick Boutet (born 14 December 1951) is a French gymnast. He competed in eight events at the 1976 Summer Olympics.

References

1951 births
Living people
French male artistic gymnasts
Olympic gymnasts of France
Gymnasts at the 1976 Summer Olympics
Place of birth missing (living people)